Costume during the thirteenth century in Europe was very simple for both men and women, and quite uniform across the continent.  Male and female clothing was relatively similar, and changed very slowly, if at all.  Most clothing, especially outside the wealthier classes, remained little changed from three or four centuries earlier.  The century saw great progress in the dyeing and working of wool, which was by far the most important material for outerwear.  For the rich, colour and rare fabrics such as silk from the silkworm was very important.  Blue was introduced and became very fashionable, being adopted by the Kings of France as their heraldic colour.

Men's clothing
Men wore a tunic, cote or cotte with a surcoat over a linen shirt. One of these surcoats was the cyclas, which began as a rectangular piece of cloth with a hole in it for the head. Over time the sides were sewn together to make a long, sleeveless tunic. When sleeves and sometimes a hood were added, the cyclas became a ganache (a cap-sleeved surcoat, usually shown with hood of matching color) or a gardcorps (a long, generous-sleeved traveling robe, somewhat resembling a modern academic robe). A mantle was worn as a formal wrap. Men also wore hose, shoes, and headdress. The clothing of royalty was set apart by its rich fabric and luxurious furs. Hair and beard were moderate in length, and men generally wore their hair in a "pageboy" style, curling under at neck length. Shoes were slightly pointed, and embroidered for royalty and higher clergy.

Working men's clothing
Working men wore a short coat, or tunic, with a belt. It was slit up the center of the front so that they could tuck the corners into their belt to create more freedom of movement. They wore long braies or leggings with legs of varying length, often visible as they worked with their cotte tucked into their belt.  Hose could be worn over this, attached to the drawstring or belt at the waist. Hats included a round cap with a slight brim, the beret (just like modern French ones, complete with a little tab at the top), the coif (a little tight white hood with strings that tied under the chin), the straw hat (in widespread use among farmworkers), and the chaperon, then still a hood that came round the neck and over the shoulders.  Apart from aprons for trades like smithing, and crude clothes tied round the neck to hold seed for sowing, special clothes were not worn for working.

Style gallery

Men working in linen braies, tunics, and coifs, from the Maciejowski Bible, c. 1250.  The man on the left wears green hose over his braies.
Man in a coif and shirt (camisa) with gussets at the hem, from the Cantigas de Santa Maria, Spain, mid-13th century.
Falconers wear belted tunics and coifs, 1240s.
Young Merlin wears a short tunic with a rectangular cloak or mantle and hose.  King Vortigern wears a mantle draped over both shoulders over a long robe or tunic and shoes with straps at the instep. From a manuscript of Geoffrey of Monmouth's Prophetia Merlini, c. 1250–70.
Man in the short, hooded cape called a cappa or chaperon, c. 1250–70.
Musicians wear two long tunics, one over the other.  The tunic on the left is an early example of mi-parti or particolored clothing, made from two fabrics. Cantigas de Santa Maria, mid-13th century, Spain.
Pan-pipe players wear tunics with hanging sleeves over long-sleeved undertunics.  Both wear coifs. Cantigas de Santa Maria, mid-13th century, Spain.

Women's clothing

Overview
Dress for women was modest and restrained, and a narrow belt was uniform. Over it was worn the cyclas or sleeveless surcoat also worn by men. More wealthy women wore more embroidery and their mantle, held in place by a cord across the chest, might be lined with fur. Women, like men, wore hose and leather shoes.

Headdresses and hairstyles
Individuality in women's costume was expressed through their hair and headdress. One distinctive feature of women's headwear was the barbette, a chin band to which a hat or various other headdresses might be attached. This hat might be a "woman's coif", which more nearly resembled a pillbox hat, severely plain or fluted. The hair was often confined by a net called a crespine or crespinette, visible only at the back. Later in the century the barbette and coif were reduced to narrow strips of cloth, and the entire hairdress might be covered with the crespine, the hair fashionably bulky over the ears. Coif and barbettes were white, while the crespine might be colored or gold. The wimple and veil of the 12th century still seen on nuns today was still worn, mainly by older women and widows.
Women also wore long tunics that went down to their ankles. This was worn over a shirt.

Wealthier women's jewelry
Wealthy women often wore clothes lined with fur. They wore jewelry and jewels such to make them look wealthy. Rings and brooches were made of gold and silver, inset with uncut precious and semi-precious stones. Gold was reserved for the upper class.

Style gallery

Sumptuary laws
The Fourth Council of the Lateran of 1215 ruled that Jews and Muslims must be distinguishable by their dress, beginning the process that transformed the conical or pointed Jewish hat from something worn as a voluntary mark of difference to an enforced one. Previously it had been worn but had been regarded by European Jews as "an element of traditional garb, rather than an imposed discrimination".  A law in Breslau in 1267 said that since Jews had stopped wearing the pointed hats they used to wear, this would be made compulsory.  The Yellow badge also dates from this century, although the hat seems to have been much more widely worn.

Sumptuary laws covering prostitutes were introduced (following Ancient Roman precedent) in the 13th century: in Marseilles a striped cloak, in England a striped hood, and so on.  Over time these tended to be reduced to distinctive bands of fabric attached to the arm or shoulder, or tassels on the arm.

These probably reflected both a growing concern for control over the increasing urban populations, and the increasing effectiveness of the Church's control over social issues across the continent.

Footwear
Shoes began to develop a pointed toe at this time however, they were much more restrained than they were in the 14th century. The usual shoe for men opened at the front, from the instep to the toe. Commoners also wore stockings with leather sewn to the sole, and wooden clogs. Woollen garters were also worn by commoners.

References

Further reading
Black, J. Anderson, and Madge Garland: A History of Fashion, 1975, 

Crowfoot, Elizabeth, Frances Prichard and Kay Staniland, Textiles and Clothing c. 1150 – c. 1450, Museum of London, 1992, 
Kohler, Carl: A History of Costume, Dover Publications reprint, 1963, 
Koslin, Désirée and Janet E. Snyder, eds.: Encountering Medieval Textiles and Dress: Objects, texts, and Images, Macmillan, 2002, 
Kybalová, Ludmila, Olga Herbenová, and Milena Lamarová: Pictorial Encyclopedia of Fashion, translated by Claudia Rosoux, Paul Hamlyn/Crown, 1968, 
Laver, James: The Concise History of Costume and Fashion, Abrams, 1979
Payne, Blanche: History of Costume from the Ancient Egyptians to the Twentieth Century, Harper & Row, 1965. No ISBN for this edition; ASIN B0006BMNFS

13th-century fashion
Fashion
History of clothing (Western fashion)
Medieval European costume